Not My Type is a 2014 French-Belgian romance film directed by Lucas Belvaux and starring Émilie Dequenne and Loïc Corbery. It was based on the 2011 novel Pas son genre by Philippe Vilain. It was screened in the Contemporary World Cinema section at the 2014 Toronto International Film Festival.

Cast 
 Émilie Dequenne as Jennifer 
 Loïc Corbery as Clément Le Guern
 Sandra Nkake as Cathy 
 Charlotte Talpaert as Nolwenn 
 Anne Coesens as Hélène Pasquier-Legrand  
 Daniela Bisconti as Madame Bortolin 
 Didier Sandre as Clément's father
 Martine Chevallier as Clément's mother
 Florian Thiriet as Johan Bortolin 
 Annelise Hesme as Isabelle 
 Amira Casar as Marie 
 Tom Burgeat as Dylan 
 Kamel Zidouri as Antoine
 Philippe Le Guay as the presenter

Accolades

References

External links 
 

2014 films
2014 romance films
2010s French-language films
French romance films
Films directed by Lucas Belvaux
Belgian romance films
French-language Belgian films
2010s French films